Schiedea is a genus of flowering plants in the family Caryophyllaceae. It contains 34 species and is endemic to Hawaii.

A 35th species was spotted in 2017 by Tom DeMent while surveying a forest near Laupāhoehoe on Hawai‘i Island. It has yet to be named.

Selected species
Schiedea adamantis H.St.John - Diamond Head schiedea (Oahu, Hawaii)
Schiedea amplexicaulis H.Mann
Schiedea apokremnos H.St.John
Schiedea attenuata W.L.Wagner, Weller & Sakai
Schiedea diffusa A.Gray
Schiedea globos H.Mann
Schiedea haleakalensis Degener & Sherff in Sherff
Schiedea hawaiiensis Hillebrand
Schiedea helleri Sherff
Schiedea hookeri A.Gray
Schiedea implexa (Hillebrand) SherffAdvanced
Schiedea jacobii W.L.Wagner, Weller & Madeiros in W.L.Wagner et al.
Schiedea kaalae Wawra - Maolioli (Oʻahu, Hawaii)
Schiedea kauaiensis H.St.John
Schiedea kealiae Caum & Hosaka
Schiedea laui W.L.Wagner & Weller
Schiedea ligustrina Chamisso & Schlechtendal
Schiedea lychnoides Hillebrand
Schiedea lydgatei Hillebrand
Schiedea mannii H.St.John
Schiedea membranacea H.St.John
Schiedea menziesii Hooker
Schiedea nuttallii Hooker
Schiedea obovata (Sherff) W.L.Wagner & Weller
Schiedea pentandra W.L.Wagner & E.Harris
Schiedea perlmanii W.L.Wagner & Weller
Schiedea pubescens Hillebrand
Schiedea salicaria Hillebrand
Schiedea sarmentosa Degener & Sherff in Sherff
Schiedea spergulina A.Gray
Schiedea stellarioides H.Mann
Schiedea trinervis (H.Mann) Pax & K.Hoffmann
Schiedea verticillata F.Brown in Christophersen & Caum - Nihoa carnation (Nihoa, Northwestern Hawaiian Islands)
Schiedea viscosa H.Mann

Gallery

References

 
Caryophyllaceae genera
Taxonomy articles created by Polbot